is a Japanese retired football player.

Club career
Arai joined J2 League club Yokohama FC in 2017. After a year at FC Ryukyu in 2019, 25-year old Arai retired at the end of the year.

National team career
In June 2011, Arai was elected Japan U-17 national team for 2011 U-17 World Cup. He played 1 match as captain against Argentina.

References

External links

1994 births
Living people
Waseda University alumni
Association football people from Saitama Prefecture
Japanese footballers
J2 League players
Yokohama FC players
FC Ryukyu players
Association football defenders